José Maria Carvalho Pedroto, OIH (21 October 1928 – 7 January 1985), was a Portuguese football midfielder and manager.

He amassed Primeira Liga totals of 227 matches and 57 goals over 11 seasons, at the service of Lusitano, Belenenses and Porto.

After retiring, Pedroto embarked in a coaching career which lasted 22 years (always in the Portuguese top division), going on to become one of Porto's most successful managers.

Playing career

Club
Born in the village of Almacave in Lamego, Viseu District, Pedroto began his senior career with Lusitano F.C. in Vila Real de Santo António, to where he had been relocated to perform his military service. In February 1950, he scored two of his 12 goals for the season in home wins against FC Porto (3–1) and Sporting CP (2–0), as the Primeira Liga title was eventually awarded to S.L. Benfica.

In 1950, the 21-year-old Pedroto signed with Lisbon-based C.F. Os Belenenses after being offered a position in the Navy Ministry. He joined Porto two years later, for 335.000 escudos.

Pedroto won the national championship twice during his spell at the Estádio das Antas, under Dorival Yustrich and Béla Guttmann. He retired at the age of 31, being immediately named his last club's junior coach.

International
Over five years, Pedroto won 17 caps for Portugal. He made his debut on 20 April 1952, in a 3–0 friendly loss to France.

Coaching career
After becoming a manager, Pedroto was initially in charge of Académica de Coimbra. He then spent one season apiece with Leixões S.C. and Varzim SC, being dismissed by the former midway through 1964–65 which marked the only occasion in his career where he was relieved of his duties; subsequently, he returned to Porto as an assistant.

Over three top-tier campaigns, Pedroto led Porto to the third place twice and the second in 1968–69, winning the Taça de Portugal in 1968, He left, however, for Vitória de Setúbal, who would finish a best-ever league runners-up in 1971–72 and twice reach the quarter-finals of the Inter-Cities Fairs Cup while he was in charge, notably ousting Liverpool in the second round of the 1969–70 edition of the latter tournament.

Starting in 1974 and during two years, Pedroto coached both Boavista F.C. and the Portugal national team. He won the domestic cup always during his tenure at the former, also finishing in second position in the league in the 1975–76 season. With the latter, he did not manage to qualify for UEFA Euro 1976 in spite of only losing one match in Group 1.

Pedroto returned to Porto ahead of 1976–77, ending a 19-year drought the following campaign by winning the championship and repeating the feat the next season. He was, however, fired in the summer of 1980 after a run-in with president Américo de Sá. He arguably set the foundations for the club's European exploits in the mid-to-late 1980s.

For several decades, Pedroto was the manager with the most wins in the Portuguese top flight with 326. His sides excelled in ball possession and attacking football, and he was also one of the first managers to introduce a team physician; he was accused by fellow coach Mário Wilson of being a "master of conflict", with the pair being often involved in wars of words.

Personal life and death
Pedroto was affectionately known as "Zé do Boné" (Cap Joe), due to his habit of wearing a flat tweed cap all the time. He was an avid fisher and reader, who also took an interest in the occult.

Pedroto died on 7 January 1985 in Porto at the age of 56, due to cancer.

Honours

Player
Porto
Primeira Liga: 1955–56, 1958–59
Taça de Portugal: 1955–56, 1957–58

Manager
Boavista
Taça de Portugal: 1974–75, 1975–76

Porto
Primeira Liga: 1977–78, 1978–79
Taça de Portugal: 1967–68, 1976–77, 1983–84
Supertaça Cândido de Oliveira: 1983

References

External links

1928 births
1985 deaths
People from Lamego
Sportspeople from Viseu District
Portuguese footballers
Association football midfielders
Primeira Liga players
Leixões S.C. players
C.F. Os Belenenses players
FC Porto players
Portugal international footballers
Portuguese football managers
Primeira Liga managers
Associação Académica de Coimbra – O.A.F. managers
Leixões S.C. managers
Varzim S.C. managers
FC Porto managers
Vitória F.C. managers
Boavista F.C. managers
Vitória S.C. managers
Portugal national football team managers